Mikhail Yuryevich Kazimir (born 7 June 2001) is a Russian football player who plays for FC Dynamo Bryansk.

Club career
He made his debut in the Russian Football National League for FC KAMAZ Naberezhnye Chelny on 17 July 2021 in a game against FC Tekstilshchik Ivanovo.

References

External links
 
 Profile by Russian Football National League

2001 births
Living people
Russian footballers
Association football midfielders
FC Lokomotiv Moscow players
FC Lada-Tolyatti players
FC KAMAZ Naberezhnye Chelny players
FC Dynamo Bryansk players
Russian Second League players
Russian First League players